Payyavoor  is a small town in Kannur district in the Indian state of Kerala. It's the headquarters of Payyavoor Grama Panchayat.

Location

Demographics
As of 2011 Census, Payyavoor village had a population of 22,998 with 11,373 males and 11,625 females. Average sex ratio was 1,022 lower than state average of 1,084. Population of children under 6 years was 2,359 (10.3%) which constitutes 1,219 males and 1,140 females.
Payyavoor had an average literacy of 95.46% where male literacy was 96.8% and female literacy was 94.1%.

Administration
Payyavoor Grama Panchayat is a part of Irikkur Block Panchayat. Payyavoor Panchayat is politically a part of Irikkur Assembly constituency in Kannur Loksabha constituency.

Educational Institutions

 Sacred Higher Secondary School, Payyavoor
 St. Anne's English Medium School, Payyavoor
 Govt. UP School, Payyavoor
 Vimal Jyothi Engineering College, Chemperi
 Devamatha Arts and Science College, Paisakari

Economy
Payyavoor panchayat is mainly an agrarian economy. The major crops are cashew, rubber, coconut and areca nut here. A distillery has been proposed by the Kerala government here for making Kannur feni (liquor) from cashew apples. Payyavoor service co-operative bank was given nod for producing liquor. Apart from the one being set up in Kerala, Goa state is widely known for the production of feni from cashew apples.

Payyavur was one among the panchayats in Kannur district that affected by 2018 Kerala floods. 4 hecatres of cropped area was destroyed by land slide. The affected areas in the panchayat were side slope of Upland (307m) like  Vanjiyam, Adampara, Thenankara and Santhi nagar.

Transportation

Mangalore and Mumbai can be accessed on the northern side and Cochin and Thiruvananthapuram can be accessed on the southern side. The road to the east connects to Mysore and Bangalore. The nearest railway station is Kannur on Shoranur-Mangalore Section line. There are other airports at Calicut and Mangalore.

Kerala Hill Highway (SH 59) passes through Payyavoor town which connects nearby towns like Chemperi, Ulikkal, Iritty, Naduvil, Karuvanchal, Alakode etc.

References

Villages near Irikkur